William 'Bill' J. Gray (born December 19, 1940 in Artesia, New Mexico) is an American politician and a Republican former member of the New Mexico House of Representatives representing District 54 since January 2007. He did not seek reelection in 2014.

Education
Gray attended New Mexico Military Institute and earned his BS in industrial engineering from Texas Tech University.

Elections
 2012 Gray was unopposed for both the June 5, 2012 Republican Primary, winning with 1,425 votes and the November 6, 2012 General election, winning with 7,465 votes.
 2006 When District 54 Democratic Representative Joe Stell retired and left the seat open, Gray was unopposed for the June 6, 2006 Republican Primary, winning with 417 votes and won the November 7, 2006 General election with 2,838 votes (54.8%) against Democratic nominee Christy Bourgeois.
 2008 Gray was unopposed for both the June 8, 2008 Republican Primary, winning with 982 votes and the November 4, 2008 General election, winning with 4,833 votes.
 2010 Gray was unopposed for both the June 1, 2010 Republican Primary, winning with 913 votes and the November 2, 2010 General election, winning with 3,858 votes.

References

External links
 Official page at the New Mexico Legislature
 
 William Gray at Ballotpedia
 William J. Gray at OpenSecrets

1940 births
Living people
Republican Party members of the New Mexico House of Representatives
New Mexico Military Institute alumni
People from Artesia, New Mexico
Texas Tech University alumni